Ghost in the Sheet is an adventure video game developed by Cardboard Box Entertainment in 2007. It is a first-person point-and-click adventure game. The game was released in Germany as S.C.A.R.E.

Development 
The game was created by two young developers from the Czech Republic - Jan Kavan and Lukas Medek. It was originally planned as a freeware title but feedback from the adventure game community was very positive which led to the decision of releasing it as a commercial game. It was published by Tri Synergy.

Gameplay 
The game is a Point-and-click adventure game seen form a First-person point of view. To interact with physical objects the player uses the power of telekinesis. During the game the player learns other psychical abilities that help him solve multiple puzzles. There are also arcade-style mini games like smashing rats with bricks.

Plot 
The game is a paranormal horror comedy adventure and follows a person who dies. He becomes a ghost who is forced to wear a sheet and start working for an agency investigating paranormal activity in the mortal world. He is sent to the abandoned Sector Omega factory where he meets Ghosts of its former inhabitants and investigates what happened.

As the investigation progresses the Ghost becomes suspicious about his boss from the agency. The Boss realizes it so he sends his servant Oozy to eliminate him but Oozy is killed by a hungry monster. Ghost then helps souls of local people to find peace. In the end he confronts the boss and defeats him.

Reception 
The games has received mixed to lightly positive reviews. The game currently holds 60% on Metacritic, 66.29% on GameRankings.

The most positive review was published by GameVortex where Ghost in the Sheet scored 82%. It noted that game "has its issues, but it is still an interesting offering, especially coming from a new company. Most of the issues are mainly polish issues, but the core gameplay is solid enough that it is worth a go if the premise interests you enough."

Another positive review came from GameZebo where it scored 80%. The review praised the voice acting, music and graphics. Another praise was gained for story which was found interesting and lengthy. On the other hand, the game was criticised for its Mini games, pixel hunting and system of moving between rooms.

The game was also awarded by Editors' Choice Award on server Computer Times.

Other reviews include GameSpot with 60%- It praised the plot and puzzles but criticised production values, a gameplay which does not take advantage of supernatural theme and that its easy to  get lost in dark areas.

In the Czech Republic where developers come from the game has received generally negative reviews. The average score was 45.5%.

The most negative review came from server Games.cz. The game scored 30%. The reviewer noted that 20% was gained for originality and 10% for euthusianism of developers.

References

External links 
 Official site

2007 video games
Adventure games
Indie video games
Video games developed in the Czech Republic
Windows games
Windows-only games
Single-player video games
Video games about ghosts
Tri Synergy games